On the evening of July 13, 1965, Hubert Damon Strange shot Willie Brewster as Brewster drove past him on Highway 202 outside Anniston, Alabama; two days later, Brewster died in a hospital. In December of that year, Strange was convicted of second-degree murder; this was the first time in the history of Alabama that a white man was convicted of killing a black man.

Killing
On July 15, 1965, Brewster was driving home with his coworkers from a nightshift at the Union Foundry, when shots were fired into the car by white supremacist Hubert Damon Strange. Brewster was hit in the neck and died three days afterwards from his wounds. The Anniston Star published a full-page advertisement announcing that they would "pledge the sum of $20,000 to the person who supplies information leading to the arrest and conviction of those responsible for the shooting Thursday night of Willie Brewster." Hubert Damon Strange was later convicted of the murder by an all-white jury on December 2, 1965. After seven hours of deliberation, the jury sentenced him to 10 years in prison. It was the first such decision by any all-white jury in Alabama. The plot of shooting a black person was allegedly hatched at Ku Klux Klan member Kenneth Adams' filling station the night before Brewster was killed.  The men behind the killing belonged to the National States' Rights Party, a violent Neo-Nazi group whose members had been involved in church bombings and murders of blacks.

Aftermath
Strange never served his sentence: he was released pending appeal, and in 1967 was killed in a fight. His appeal was subsequently dismissed.

Legacy
A memorial marker was erected near the site of the shooting in 2016, by the City of Anniston Historic Trails Program. Brewster's name was placed on the Southern Poverty Law Center's list of Civil Rights Martyrs.

References

1965 murders in the United States
Racially motivated violence against African Americans
Murdered African-American people
July 1965 events in the United States
Crimes in Alabama
Civil rights movement
People murdered in Alabama
Deaths by firearm in Alabama
Anniston, Alabama